Jean-François de Bastide (15 July 1724, Marseille – 4 July 1798, Milan aged 73) was an 18th-century French writer and playwright.

The son of a magistrate from Provence, Bastide was a polygraph: he wrote novels (Histoire d'une religieuse par elle-même, "Bibliothèque universelle des romans", May 1786, 24 p. in-16), theatre plays, critics, and was also a journalist and a compilator. As a journalist, he published Le Nouveau spectateur (1758–60), Le Monde tel qu'il est (1760–61), Journal de Bruxelles ou le Penseur (1766–67), etc. He also directed the "Bibliothèque universelle des romans" from 1779 to 1789.

As a playwright, he composed:
1749: Le Désenchantement inespéré
1762: L'Épreuve de la probité
1763: Les Caractères de la musique
1763: Les Deux talents, opéra comique presented at Comédie Italienne 11 August (music by chevalier d'Herbain)
1764: Le Jeune homme, comedy presented in Bordeaux
1766: Les Amants opposés, comedy presented in The Hague 11 March
 La Majorité, comedy presented the same day in the same theatre
1766: Le Soldat par amour, opéra comique presented in Brussel, at Théâtre de la Monnaie, 4 November (music by Pieter van Maldere and Ignaz Vitzthumb)
 Gésoncourt et Clémentine, tragedy presented the same day in the same theatre.
 La Petite-Maison, published in Contes de M. de Bastide, Paris, L. Cellot, 1763, II, 1, p. 47-88

External links 
His plays and their presentations on CÉSAR
La petite maison on Cairninfo

18th-century French writers
18th-century French male writers
18th-century French dramatists and playwrights
French opera librettists
Writers from Marseille
1724 births
1798 deaths